John Cavanagh (born 21 July 1956 in London) is a disabled British archer. He won gold at the men's W1 individual compound of the 2004 Summer Paralympics and silver at the men's W1 individual compound of the 2008 Summer Paralympics.

References

External links 
 

1956 births
Living people
English male archers
Paralympic archers of Great Britain
Paralympic gold medalists for Great Britain
Paralympic silver medalists for Great Britain
Paralympic medalists in archery
Archers at the 2004 Summer Paralympics
Archers at the 2008 Summer Paralympics
Archers at the 2012 Summer Paralympics
Medalists at the 2004 Summer Paralympics
Medalists at the 2008 Summer Paralympics
Sportspeople from London